Franciscan High School, Baton Rouge, Louisiana, opened in August 2016, as Cristo Rey Franciscan High School and part of the Cristo Rey Network.  In July 2022, the school became known as Franciscan High School, operating with the sponsorship of the Franciscan Missionaries of Our Lady and within the Diocese of Baton Rouge.

History
The school was founded by the Franciscan Missionaries of Our Lady and began classes on August 8, 2016 in the former Redemptorist High School buildings in North Baton Rouge.  On August 12–13, 2016, the school buildings were lost in the Great Flood of Baton Rouge.  The school relocated to Bon Carre Technology Park for the remainder of the 2016-2017 school year and the start of the 2017-2018 school year.  In February 2018, the school returned to its original campus on St. Gerard Avenue in modular buildings.

The school added a grade level each year until its first graduating class, the Class of 2020, received their diplomas from Cristo Rey Baton Rouge on May 23, 2020.  The inaugural graduating class included 41 seniors.

Corporate Work Study Program
Franciscan High School utilizes a unique Corporate Work Study program model whereby all students of the school are employed by a corporate work partner.  Students work one day per week at their corporate work study placement to help earn a portion of their tuition.  As of 2022, the program has over 40 local partners.

Athletics
Cristo Rey Baton Rouge Franciscan High athletics competes in the LHSAA.

References

External links
 Cristo Rey Network

Franciscan high schools
Catholic secondary schools in Louisiana
Community-building organizations
Educational institutions established in 2016
2016 establishments in Louisiana
Poverty-related organizations